The 1908 South Australian Football League season was the 32nd season of the top-level Australian rules football competition in South Australia.

 won their 1st SAFL premiership along with their 1st Championship of Australia against .

Ladder

References 

SAFL
South Australian National Football League seasons